Walter Kieber (20 February 1931 – 21 June 2014) was a political figure from Liechtenstein.

Prime Minister of Liechtenstein

Kieber was the Deputy Prime Minister of Liechtenstein from 1970 to 1974 and the Prime Minister of Liechtenstein from 1974 to 1978, and again Deputy Prime Minister from 1978 to 1980. He belonged to the Progressive Citizens' Party.

In 1975, he was a signatory of the Helsinki Accords to create the Conference for Security and Co-operation in Europe, the precursor of today's OSCE.

Kieber died on 21 June 2014 at the age of 83.

See also

 Politics of Liechtenstein

References

1931 births
2014 deaths
Heads of government of Liechtenstein
Deputy Prime Ministers of Liechtenstein
Progressive Citizens' Party politicians